Jovan Kolundžija (born 4 October 1948) is a Serbian violin maestro and politician. He has been a member of the National Assembly of Serbia since 2020, serving as an independent member in the parliamentary group of the Serbian Progressive Party (Srpska napredna stranka, SNS).

Early life and musical career
Kolundžija was born in Belgrade, in what was then the People's Republic of Serbia in the People's Federal Republic of Yugoslavia. He earned a master's degree in music from the University of Arts in Belgrade and later studied with Henryk Szeryng. He performs on a 1745 Guarnerius.

Kolundžija is the founder of the Guarnerius Centre for Fine Arts in Belgrade, which was recognized as an institution of cultural significance by the government of Serbia in 2013. He has participated in more than four thousand concerts internationally, including performances at Carnegie Hall and the Tchaikovsky Concert Hall.

In 1994, Kolundžija was the featured violinist for a program called The Ten Magnificents, which comprised performances of concertos by J.S. Bach, Antonio Vivaldi, Wolfgang Amadeus Mozart, Felix Mendelssohn, Max Bruch, Édouard Lalo, Henryk Wieniawski, Pyotr Ilyich Tchaikovsky, Ludwig van Beethoven, and Johannes Brahms over the course of four days. In 2008, he performed a program called Do You Love Beethoven? in Belgrade, which included all of Beethoven's sonatas for solo violin and piano.

He is the brother of the pianist Nada Kolundžija, with whom he has frequently performed.

Politician
Kolundžija received the third position on the Progressive Party's Aleksandar Vučić — For Our Children electoral list in the 2020 Serbian parliamentary election. This was tantamount to election, and he was indeed elected when the list won a landslide majority with 188 out of 250 mandates. In announcing his candidacy, he said he would work in a non-partisan capacity for meaningful changes in Serbia's cultural sector. During his first term, he was a member of the assembly's culture and information committee and a deputy member of Serbia's delegation to the Parliamentary Assembly of the Mediterranean.

He appeared in the ninth position on the SNS's Together We Can Do Everything list in the 2022 Serbian parliamentary election and was re-elected when the list won a plurality victory with 120 seats.

References

1948 births
Living people
Musicians from Belgrade
Politicians from Belgrade
Serbian violinists
Members of the National Assembly (Serbia)
Deputy Members of the Parliamentary Assembly of the Mediterranean